Thomas Rock is a small nunatak lying 1 nautical mile (1.9 km) northeast of Tent Rock and 6 nautical miles (11 km) west of Ricker Hills in the Prince Albert Mountains, Victoria Land. Mapped by United States Geological Survey (USGS) from surveys and U.S. Navy air photos 1956–62. Named by Advisory Committee on Antarctic Names (US-ACAN) for Kenneth E. Thomas, radioman with the winter party at South Pole Station, 1966.

Nunataks of Oates Land